The 2022 Engie Open Andrézieux-Bouthéon 42 was a professional tennis tournament played on indoor hard courts. It was the twelfth edition of the tournament which was part of the 2022 ITF Women's World Tennis Tour. It took place in Andrézieux-Bouthéon, France between 24 and 30 January 2022.

Singles main-draw entrants

Seeds

 1 Rankings are as of 17 January 2022.

Other entrants
The following players received wildcards into the singles main draw:
  Émeline Dartron
  Salma Djoubri
  Evita Ramirez
  Margaux Rouvroy

The following players received entry from the qualifying draw:
  Erika Andreeva
  Manon Arcangioli
  Clarisse Aussert
  Berfu Cengiz
  Fiona Ganz
  Léolia Jeanjean
  Victoria Muntean
  Raluca Șerban

Champions

Singles

  Ana Bogdan def.  Anna Blinkova, 7–5, 6–3

Doubles

  Estelle Cascino /  Jessika Ponchet def.  Alicia Barnett /  Olivia Nicholls, 6–4, 6–1

References

External links
 2022 Engie Open Andrézieux-Bouthéon 42 at ITFtennis.com
 Official website

2022 ITF Women's World Tennis Tour
2022 in French tennis
January 2022 sports events in France